World Masters Orienteering Championships (WMOC) are annual international orienteering competitions and the official world championship for orienteering runners above the age of 35.

The WMOC 2016 was arranged  7-13 August 2016 in Estonia.

Sprint 
Sprint qualification was held in Tallinn Kadrioru Park, the most outstanding palatial and urban park in Estonia, and sprint finals were held in Tallinn's Old Town. 25 champions were celebrated the first final day 8 August 2016.

MEN M35

WOMEN W35

MEN M40

WOMEN W40

MEN M45

WOMEN W45

MEN M50

WOMEN W50

MEN M55

WOMEN W55

MEN M60

WOMEN W60

MEN M65

WOMEN W65

MEN M70

WOMEN W70

MEN M75

WOMEN W75

MEN M80

WOMEN W80

MEN M85

WOMEN W85

MEN M90

WOMEN W90

WOMEN W95

Long distance 
Long qualification was held at Kõrvemaa, a wilderness area, dominated by glacial landforms, coniferous forests and extensive bogs, and the long distance final at Pikasaare, with competition centre located in Estonian Defence Forces main military training field, a pine and spruce forest with many features typical of morainic terrain. 24 champions were celebrated the last final day 13 August 2016.

MEN M35

WOMEN W35

MEN M40

WOMEN W40

MEN M45

WOMEN W45

MEN M50

WOMEN W50

MEN M55

WOMEN W55

MEN M60

WOMEN W60

MEN M65

WOMEN W65

MEN M70

WOMEN W70

MEN M75

WOMEN W75

MEN M80

WOMEN W80

MEN M85

WOMEN W85

MEN M90

WOMEN W95

External links 

Official web site

References 

Orienteering competitions